Bashkir Scientific Research Center for Beekeeping and Apitherapy (Russian: Башкирский научно-исследовательский центр (БНИЦ) по пчеловодству и апитерапии) is a Bashkirian State premier research institute based in Ufa, Republic of Bashkortostan, Russia, specialized in beekeeping and apitherapy.
The institute was established by Amir Ishemgulov in 1998.
200 species of medical and preventive, nutrition products and cosmetics supply is produced in the Center, and exported to other countries.

The Center is a large producer of high quality and ecologically safe Bashkirian honey.
The Center is the only and the primary holder of license "Bashkir honey".

Since 2005 the Center has exported honey to the USA and Western Europe.
The Center also exports honey to Asia.

References

External links 
  
 “BASHSPIRT” and Bashkir scientific-research institute for bee-keeping and apitherapy will present Bashkiria at “Green Week” in Berlin (19 January 2012)

Beekeeping in Russia
Beekeeping organizations
Apitherapy
Research institutes in Russia
Research institutes established in 1998
1998 establishments in Russia
Medical research institutes in Russia
Science and technology in Bashkortostan
Agricultural organizations based in Russia